William Robert Gregory  (20 May 1881 – 23 January 1918) was an Irish flying ace who served as a fighter pilot with the Royal Flying Corps during World War I. He was also an accomplished artist and cricket player. His death was memorialised in a series of poems by W. B. Yeats.

Early life and family
The only child of William Henry Gregory and Lady Gregory, an associate of W. B. Yeats, Robert was born in County Galway in Ireland in May 1881. He grew up in the couple's houses in Ireland and England (Coole Park and London). He studied at Harrow, Oxford University and the Slade School of Art

Sport
He excelled at bowls, boxing, horse riding and cricket. He was good enough at cricket to play once for the Ireland cricket team, taking 8/80 with his leg spin bowling in a first-class match against Scotland in 1912. He didn't score a run. His bowling performance in that match remains the tenth best in all matches for Ireland and the fourth best in first-class cricket for Ireland. His bowling average of 10.22 is the second best for Ireland in first-class cricket.

Art
An accomplished artist, he studied in London at the Slade School of Fine Art, eventually marrying another Slade student, Margaret Parry; his best-man was Augustus John, who had assisted him in developing his style. He worked in Paris at the design studio of Jacques Émile Blanche, and had his own exhibition of paintings in Chelsea in 1914. He was also an illustrator for books and stage.

World War I
In 1915 Gregory joined the war effort, although he was now 34, and had three children. He briefly became a member of the 4th Connaught Rangers, but quickly transferred in 1916 to the Royal Flying Corps. A fighter pilot, he eventually was credited with eight victories. His colleagues Mick Mannock and George McElroy, with many more victories, became much better known, but he was the first of the Irish pilots to achieve ace status in 40 Squadron RFC. France made him a Chevalier of the Legion d'Honneur in 1917, and he was awarded a Military Cross for "conspicuous gallantry and devotion to duty."

He flew the Royal Aircraft Factory R.E.8, the French Nieuport, and, at the time of his death, the Sopwith Camel.

Death and legacy
He was killed in Italy at the age of 36. It has been commonly stated that he was the victim of "friendly fire", when an Italian pilot mistakenly shot him down; but other sources say it was a flying accident. In 2017, Geoffrey O'Byrne White, a director of the Irish Aviation Authority, great-grandnephew of Lady Gregory, and former pilot in the Irish Air Corps, said he believed Major Gregory had become incapacitated at high altitude, attributing this to an inoculation for influenza.

Robert's death had a lasting effect on W. B. Yeats, and he became the subject of four poems by him, although Lady Gregory is reported not to have agreed with all of their content. They are: In Memory of Major Robert Gregory, An Irish Airman Foresees His Death, Shepherd and Goatherd, and Reprisals.

References

1881 births
1918 deaths
Alumni of New College, Oxford
Alumni of the Slade School of Fine Art
British Army personnel of World War I
British military personnel killed in World War I
Chevaliers of the Légion d'honneur
Connaught Rangers officers
Friendly fire incidents of World War I
Irish Anglicans
Irish artists
Irish aviators
Irish cricketers
Irish World War I flying aces
Military personnel killed by friendly fire
People educated at Harrow School
Recipients of the Military Cross
Royal Flying Corps officers
Sportspeople from County Galway